Elephant's foot may refer to:

Plants
 Adenia pechuelii, in the family Passifloraceae; endemic to Namibia
 Beaucarnea recurvata (also called ponytail palm), in the family Asparagaceae; native to eastern Mexico
 Dioscorea elephantipes, (also called Hottentot bread; syn. Testudinaria elephantipes), in the family Dioscoreaceae, native to South Africa
 Elephantopus, in the daisy family; widespread over much of Africa, southern Asia, Australia, and the Americas
 Portulacaria afra, also known as "Elephant's food"

Other uses
 The lower section of an Elephant's leg, which has an irregular profile, and 5 toes
 A geometrical design typical of Turkmen rugs
 Elephant's Foot, a formation of corium at the Chernobyl reactor site
 A half length sleeping bag; See bivvy bag
 A type of step stool with concealed spring-loaded castors allowing the step to be easily moved